John Paul Skorupan (born May 17, 1951) is a former American football linebacker in the National Football League for the Buffalo Bills and New York Giants.  He played college football at Penn State University and was drafted in the sixth round of the 1973 NFL Draft.  He is notable for being the last player to play right outside linebacker for the Giants before Lawrence Taylor took over for the next 13 seasons.

1951 births
Living people
People from Beaver, Pennsylvania
All-American college football players
Players of American football from Pennsylvania
Buffalo Bills players
New York Giants players
Penn State Nittany Lions football players
American football linebackers